"Anchor" is a song by American rock band Cave In. The song was released as the first single from the band's third studio album Antenna. "Anchor" was Cave In's first single released through a major label and, to date, is the band's only charting single.

Music video
The song's music video was directed by Dean Karr. The video follows a man whose feet have been encased in concrete and how he struggles to cope with it. The video ends with the man being freed, as the concrete blocks fall apart and are washed away in a rainstorm.

Track listing
CD single

RCA 7" single

Magic Bullet 7" single

Charts

References

2002 songs
2003 singles
RCA Records singles